The Schlesinger Building, also known as Wesbank Centre or Sanlam Centre, is a skyscraper in Braamfontein, Johannesburg, South Africa. It has 21 floors. The building is named for John Schlesinger, a Johannesburg businessman who was also one of the first major art collectors in the city.

Doreen E. Greig, who was the first female president-in-chief of the South African Institute of Architects, described the building in her book as 'an immense building' with a 'sombre and monumental' aspect, which derived from the reflection of grey-green glass sheathing. Its facade are swollen and its vertical aluminium mullions are balanced by the horizontal glass spandrels, which also less obscure than the fenestration.

See also 
 List of tallest buildings in Africa
 List of tallest buildings in South Africa

References

Citations

Books

External links 
Amethyst: Johannesburg Landmarks. Retrieved 11 February 2008.

Buildings and structures completed in 1965
Skyscraper office buildings in Johannesburg
Office buildings completed in 1965
20th-century architecture in South Africa